The London Contemporary Orchestra (LCO), founded in 2008 by Hugh Brunt and Robert Ames, is an ensemble of young musicians who aim to "explore and promote new music to an increasingly wide audience". LCO staged its inaugural season at LSO St Luke's and has since performed at venues and festivals both in the UK and internationally including the Roundhouse, Latitude Festival, The Old Vic Tunnels, Snape Maltings, Southbank Centre, Barbican, Spitalfields Music and Royal Opera House, Yota Space, Unsound Festival.  LCO has since worked on films including Theeb, Moonlight, Macbeth (2015), Slow West, The Master, The Two Popes and American Animals (2018).

In 2010 the LCO was shortlisted for the Royal Philharmonic Society Music Awards (Audience Development category), and in 2015 LCO was the winner of the Ensemble category at the Royal Philharmonic Society Music Awards.

History
The Artistic Director role is shared between Robert Ames and Hugh Brunt. They also share the role of Principal Conductor.

The LCO's inaugural 2008 season featured music by Mark-Anthony Turnage, Kaija Saariaho, Thomas Adès, Iannis Xenakis, Simon Holt, Roberto Carnevale, Olivier Messiaen, Radiohead's Jonny Greenwood, and new works by young composers Emily Hall, Colin Alexander and Jonathan Cole. In May 2009 the LCO collaborated with experimental electronic duo Matmos and composer Anna Meredith for a series of performances at Shoreditch warehouse Village Underground. The LCO appeared at the Roundhouse in January 2010 as part of contemporary music festival 'Reverb', performing works by Steve Reich, John Cage, Biosphere and the world premiere of Shiva Feshareki's turntable concerto "TTKonzert". LCO made its debut at the Spitalfields Music Summer Festival in June 2010 and at Aldeburgh Music's 'Faster Than Sound' in May 2010. In October 2010, the Roundhouse staged three screenings of Metropolis (restored version) with Gottfried Huppertz's original score performed live by the LCO. Later that year, the LCO gave a performance of Frank Zappa's "The Yellow Shark" as part of the Roundhouse's 'Frank Zappa – 70th Birthday Celebration'. LCO returned to the Roundhouse in August 2011 to collaborate with Ron Arad on 'Curtain Call'. The LCO staged its first 'LCO Soloists' project at The Old Vic Tunnels in May 2011. In March 2012, the LCO performed works by Xenakis, Gabriel Prokofiev, Jonny Greenwood and Vivier to a capacity audience of 1,200 as part of 'Reverb 2012' at the Roundhouse. The LCO made its Southbank Centre debut in 2012 closing Meltdown Festival (curated by Antony Hegarty) with a performance of William Basinski's "The Disintegration Loops".

In 2013, The LCO performed in the abandoned Aldwych underground station, 350 ft underground, Claude Vivier's Glaubst du an die Unsterblichkeit der Seele ('Do You Believe in the Immortality of the Soul?'). The LCO was the winner of the Ensemble category in 2015 at the Royal Philharmonic Society Music Awards.

In 2018 London Contemporary Orchestra featured in Thom Yorke's first feature film score, Suspiria. Suspiria was nominated for Best Song Written for Visual Media at the 62nd Annual Grammy Awards. In 2019 the LCO collaborated with composer Jed Kuzel on a number of film projects including The Mustang, Seberg and in 2020 on True History of The Kelly Gang.

In January 2022 performed 24, a continuous 24-hour long concert at the Barbican Centre. This included performances from electronic musicians KMRU, Actress, and Powell, plus works by John Cage, Éliane Radigue, Mica Levi, Alvin Lucier, Michael Gordon and James Tenney. Morton Feldman’s String Quartet No 2 was also performed. Visuals were designed by projection mapping artist László Zsolt Bordos.

Collaborations
The LCO performed with headliners Belle & Sebastian at Latitude Festival in July 2010 and rejoined the band for their UK tour in December 2010. The concerts reprised many of the arrangements first performed by Belle & Sebastian and the Los Angeles Philharmonic at the Hollywood Bowl in 2006. In June 2010 members from the LCO joined Mercury Prize-nominated band Foals at Glastonbury Festival for a BBC 6 Music live session. The LCO appear on the band's single "Spanish Sahara" (radio edit). LCO has worked with artists, composers and brands including Secret Cinema, Actress, Vivienne Westwood, Arcade Fire, Goldfrapp, Nike, William Basinski, Biosphere, Mira Calix, Mara Carlyle, Mike Figgis, Simon Fisher Turner, Foals, Jonny Greenwood, Matmos, Jimmy Page, Jed Kurzel, Frank Ocean, Taylor Swift and United Visual Artists.

LCO strings and choir feature prominently on Radiohead's 2016 Mercury-nominated album A Moon Shaped Pool. In collaboration with Spitfire Audio, LCO developed a sample library of strings in 2017 and in 2019 they released a second collaboration sample, this time of textures. On November 19, 2019, LCO's collaboration with Bastille for the 2019 John Lewis Christmas advert was released.

LCO X Spitfire Audio 
In 2017 LCO collaborated with Spitfire Audio to create London Contemporary Orchestra Strings, a string sample library made up of 42,094 samples. The sample set was recorded in a tight room with sections of six violins, four violas, three cellos and two basses.

In 2019 for a second time the LCO collaborated with Spitfire Audio to create London Contemporary Orchestra Textures. The sample library recorded in an aircraft hangar features four grouped instrument ensembles, each comprising 12 individual textures.

Awards 
In 2010 the LCO was shortlisted for the Royal Philharmonic Society Music Awards (Audience Development category), and in 2015 LCO was the winner of the Ensemble category at the Royal Philharmonic Society Music Awards.

Filmography

The Master score performed by London Contemporary Orchestra
Release Date: 21 September 2012
Director: Paul Thomas Anderson

Awards: Chicago Film Critics Association Awards – Best Original Score

Theeb score performed by London Contemporary Orchestra
Release Date: 19 March 2015
Director: Naji Abu Nowar

Awards: BAFTA – Outstanding Debut by a British Writer, Director or Producer; Academy Award nominated – Best Foreign Language Film of the Year

Slow West score performed by London Contemporary Orchestra
Release Date: 16 April 2015
Director: John Maclean

Awards: Sundance Film Festival – World Cinema (Dramatic); Screen Music Awards – Feature Film Score of the Year

Rattle the Cage score performed by London Contemporary Orchestra
Release Date: 10 December 2015
Director: Majid Al Ansari

Macbeth score performed by London Contemporary Orchestra
Release Date: 11 December 2015
Director: Justin Kurzel

Awards: Cannes Film Festival nominated – Palme d'Or

Radiohead: "Daydreaming" (Video Short) score performed by London Contemporary Orchestra
Release Date: 6 May 2016
Director: Paul Thomas Anderson

Awards: MTV Video Music Awards Japan nominated - Best Rock Video

The White King score performed by London Contemporary Orchestra
Release Date: 18 June 2016
Directors: Alex Helfrecht, Jörg Tittel

Awards: Michael Powell Award nominated - Best British Feature Film; Edinburgh International Film Festival nominated - Best Performance in a British Feature Film

"The Dead Sea" (Short) score performed by London Contemporary Orchestra
Release Date: 3 December 2016 
Director: Stuart Gatt

Awards: Triforce Short Film Festival - The Audience Choice Award

Assassin's Creed score performed by London Contemporary Orchestra
Release Date: 14 December 2016
Director: Justin Kurzel

Awards: Golden Trailer Awards - Golden Fleece TV Spot; Golden Trailer Awards nominated - Best Original Score TV Spot

Alien: Covenant score performed by London Contemporary Orchestra
Release Date: 4 May 2017
Director: Ridley Scott

Awards: Academy of Science Fiction, Fantasy & Horror Films nominated - Best Science Film Award; Fright Meter Awards nominated - Best Special Effects

You Were Never Really Here score performed by London Contemporary Orchestra
Release Date: 27 May 2017
Director: Lynne Ramsay

Awards: Cannes Film Festival – Best Actor; Best Screenplay

The Ritual score performed by London Contemporary Orchestra
Release Date: 13 October 2017
Director: David Bruckner

Phantom Thread score performed by London Contemporary Orchestra
Release Date: 25 December 2017 
Director: Paul Thomas Anderson

Awards: Academy Award, BAFTA and Golden Globe nominated

American Animals score performed by London Contemporary Orchestra

Release Date: 19 January 2018 
Director: Bart Layton

Awards: British Independent Film Awards - Debut Screenwriter and Best Editing

What They Had score performed by London Contemporary Orchestra

Release Date: 2 May 2018
Director: Elizabeth Chomko

Calibre score performed by London Contemporary Orchestra

Release Date: 22 June 2018
Director: Matt Palmer

Awards: Bafta Scotland Awards winner and British Independent Film Award Nominee

Three Identical Strangers score performed by London Contemporary Orchestra

Release Date: 29 June 2018
Director: Tim Wardle

Awards: Primetime Emmy and BAFTA award nominated - Best Documentary

Suspiria score performed by London Contemporary Orchestra

Release Date: 2 November 2018
Director: Luca Guadagnino

Untouchable score performed by London Contemporary Orchestra

Release Date: 25 January 2019
Director: Ursula Macfarlane

Captive State score performed by London Contemporary Orchestra

Release Date: 28 March 2019
Director: Rupert Wyatt

Tell It To The Bees score performed by London Contemporary Orchestra

Release Date: 2 May 2019
Director: Annabel Jankel

The Mustang score performed by London Contemporary Orchestra

Release Date: 19 June 2019
Director: Laure de Clermont-Tonnerre

Awards: Sundance Film Festival - NHK award

Dirt Music score performed by London Contemporary Orchestra

Release Date: 11 September 2019
Director: Gregor Jordan

Awards: Australian Academy of Cinema and Television Arts (AACTA) Awards nominated - Best Original Score

Our Friend score performed by London Contemporary Orchestra

Release Date: 7 October 2019
Director: Gabriela Cowperthwaite

Overlord score performed by London Contemporary Orchestra

Release Date: 3 November 2019
Director: Julius Avery

Awards: Saturn Award nominee - Best Horror Film and Best Make-Up

The Cave score performed by London Contemporary Orchestra

Release Date: 18 October 2019
Director: Feras Fayyad

Awards: Academy Award nominee - Best Documentary Feature

Seberg score performed by London Contemporary Orchestra

Release Date: 13 December 2019
Director: Benedict Andrews

The Cave score performed by London Contemporary Orchestra

Release Date: 18 October 2019
Director: Feras Fayyad

Awards: Academy Award nominee - Best Documentary Feature

The Two Popes score performed by London Contemporary Orchestra

Release Date: 29 November 2019
Director: Fernando Meyrelles

Awards: Academy Awards, Golden Globe Awards, British Academy Film Awards and Critics' Choice Movie Awards nominated

Dream Horse orchestra by London Contemporary Orchestra

Release Date: 24 January 2020
Director: Euros Lyn

True History Of The Kelly Gang score performed by London Contemporary Orchestra

Release Date: 28 February 2020
Director: Justin Kurzel

Awards: Australian Academy of Cinema and Television Arts (AACTA) Awards - Best Original Score

Lost Girls score performed by London Contemporary Orchestra

Release Date: 9 March 2020
Director: Liz Garbus

Sulphur and White score performed by London Contemporary Orchestra

Release Date: 27 February 2020

Director: Julian Jarrold

The Forgotten Battle score performed by London Contemporary Orchestra

Release Date: 14 December 2020
Director: Matthijs van Heijningen Jr.

Cyrano score performed by London Contemporary Orchestra

Release Date: 25 February 2021
Director: Joe Wright

Encounter score performed by London Contemporary Orchestra

Release Date: 10 December 2021
Director: Michael Pearce

Awards: British Independent Film Awards nominated

The Matrix Resurrections score performed by London Contemporary Orchestra

Release Date: 21 December 2021
Director: Lana Wachowski

Awards: BAFTA nominated

Licorice Pizza score performed by London Contemporary Orchestra

Release Date: 28 December 2021
Director: Paul Thomas Anderson

Jetski score performed by London Contemporary Orchestra

Release Date: 20 September 2022
Director: James Nunn

Living score performed by London Contemporary Orchestra

Release Date: 04 November 2022
Director: Oliver Hermanus

Discography

Foals: "Miami" (Glastonbury Acoustic) feat. players from the LCO
Release Date: 2 July 2010
Label: Warner Music UK Limited

Foals: "Spanish Sahara" with London Contemporary Orchestra
Release Date: 12 September 2010
Label: Warner Music UK Limited

Jonny Greenwood: The Master (Original Motion Picture Soundtrack)
Release Date: 10 September 2012
Label: Nonesuch Records Inc.

Foals: Holy Fire feat. London Contemporary Orchestra
Release Date: 11 February 2013 
Label: Transgressive

Jed Kurzel: Slow West (Original Motion Picture Soundtrack)
Release Date: 12 May 2015
Label: Sony Classical Records

Jerry Lane: [https://itunes.apple.com/gb/album/theeb-original-motion-picture/id1019868611 Theeb (Original Motion Picture Soundtrack)] with London Contemporary Orchestra
Release Date: 7 August 2015
Label: Al Dakheel, Inc.Jed Kurzel: [https://itunes.apple.com/us/album/macbeth-original-motion-picture/id1041757994 Macbeth (Original Motion Picture Soundtrack)]
Release Date: 1 October 2015
Label: Decca RecordsRadiohead: A Moon Shaped Pool 
Release Date: 8 May 2016
Label: XL Recordings
Most tracks on this album feature the orchestra and choir performing arrangements by Jonny Greenwood

Frank Ocean: Endless feat. London Contemporary Orchestra
Release Date: 19 August 2016
Label: Def Jam Recordings

Frank Ocean: Blonde feat. London Contemporary Orchestra
Release Date: 20 August 2016
Label: Boys Don't Cry

Justice: Woman feat. London Contemporary Orchestra
Release Date: 18 November 2016
Label: Ed Banger Records

Alien: Covenant (Original Motion Picture Soundtrack) by Jed Kurzel
Release Date: 19 May 2017
Label: Milan Records

Actress X LCO: Audio Track 5
Release Date: 1 September 2017
Label: Ninja Tune

Phantom Thread (Original Motion Picture Soundtrack) by Jonny Greenwood
Release Date: 12 January 2018
Label: Nonesuch

Actress X LCO: Lageos
Release Date: 25 May 2018
Label: Ninja Tune

American Animals (Original Motion Picture Soundtrack) by Anne Nikitin
Release Date: 22 June 2018
Label: The Orchard

Captive State (Original Motion Picture Soundtrack) by Rob Simonsen
Release Date: 15 March 2019
Label: Masterworks

Thom Yorke: Anima 
Release Date: 19 July 2019
Label: XL Recordings

Thom Yorke: Suspiria (Music for the Luca Guadagnino Film)
Release Date: 26 October 2019
Label: XL Recordings

Dying Light 2: Stay Human
Release Date: 4 February 2022
Composer: Olivier Deriviere

The Smile: A Light for Attracting Attention feat. strings by the London Contemporary Orchestra
Release Date: 13 May 2022
Label XL Recordings

New Works

Emily Hall: "Put Flesh On!" (2008)
 Colin Alexander: "Potential Fracture Lines" (2008)
 Jonathan Cole: "Assassin Hair", revised version (2008)
 Howard Quin: "Combination Curves" (2009)
 Jonathan Cole: "burburbabbar za" (2009)
 Shiva Feshareki: "TTKonzert" (2010)
 Tristan Brookes: "Ur" (2010)
 Emily Hall and Toby Litt: "Songs" (2010)
 Mira Calix and Larry Goves: "pedotin"; "ipo" (2010)
 Simon Fisher Turner: "Attitude" (2010)
 Jonathan Cole / Colin Alexander: "Forum" (2011)
 Martin Suckling: "de sol y grana" (2011)
 Gabriel Prokofiev: "Concerto for Bass Drum and Orchestra" (2012)
 William Basinski (arr. Maxim Moston) "Disintegration Loop 2.1" (2012)
 Actress: Audio Track 5 (2017)

References

External links

 METROPOLIS led by Hugh Brunt at the NIFFF at Neuchatel in Switzerland by Gaël Dupret
 Hugh Brunt at the NIFFF at Neuchatel in Switzerland by Gaël Dupret

London orchestras
Musical groups established in 2008
Contemporary classical music ensembles
2008 in London
2008 establishments in England